Ganga Choti is a peak located in Bagh District of Azad Kashmir, Pakistan.

Geographically, it is located between the union council Birpani and Sudhan Gali village.

Etymology 
It is said by the locals that the peak got its name from the local Hindus who resided in the region the Partition of India.

Access 
Ganga Choti can be reached from two ways – one is from Chikkar, and the other is from Bagh Sudhan Gali Road. Sudhan Gali is a small town located about four kilometers from Ganga Choti, and has a few shops and hotels, which can be used by travelers. From there, it is an eight-kilometer uphill hike to reach the summit. Off-road vehicles can also be used to shorten the journey.

Winter sports 
In recent years, the AJK Winter Sports Association has been organizing winter sports activities in a bid to promote tourism and generate economic activity in the area.

See also  
Bagh District

References 

Bagh District
History of Pakistan
Mountains of Pakistan
Mountains of Azad Kashmir
Three-thousanders